The breakfast roll is a bread roll filled with elements of a traditional fried breakfast. It is served at a wide variety of convenience shops, newsagents, supermarkets, petrol stations, and casual eateries throughout Ireland.

Recipe

A breakfast roll typically consists of a bread roll or baguette containing one or more fillings such as sausages, bacon, white or black pudding, butter, mushrooms, tomatoes and tomato sauce or brown sauce. In some cases a hash brown or fried egg may be added; these fillings vary between cooks and restaurants. The roll itself is usually one of three varieties: a soft "submarine"-type roll, a chunky, spherical dinner roll or a demi-baguette. The demi-baguettes are distributed to shops partially baked and frozen, allowing stores to quickly bake the bread for a "freshly baked" roll. An "all-day breakfast" sandwich featuring some or all of the above ingredients in a traditional sandwich of sliced bread may be used instead.

Popular culture 
The popularity of the breakfast roll (and novelty songs) in Ireland led to the song "Jumbo Breakfast Roll" by comedian Pat Shortt, which reached number one in the Irish music charts and remained there for six weeks. The song was number 11 on the Irish chart list of best-selling songs of the 2000s.

It has been argued that the breakfast roll became a national dish in Ireland during the Celtic Tiger economic boom of the 1990s and 2000s, becoming synonymous with "Breakfast Roll Man", the archetypal sub-contractor who was busy with construction work and needed sustenance on the move, before the bursting of the Irish property bubble in the late 2000s.

See also 

 Breakfast sandwich
 Breakfast burrito
 Chicken fillet roll
 Mitraillette
 List of breakfast topics
 List of Irish dishes
 List of sandwiches
 Morning roll
 Hot dog

References 

Irish cuisine
Breakfast sandwiches
National dishes
Irish meat dishes